Raw Velvet is the second solo album by American songwriter and musician Bobby Whitlock, released in 1972.  The appearance of Eric Clapton, Carl Radle and Jim Gordon of Derek and the Dominos was only indicated by the representation  of 'dominoes' on the original inner sleeve.

Track listing
All songs written by Bobby Whitlock, except where noted

Side one - Raw
"Tell the Truth" (Eric Clapton, Bobby Whitlock) - 3:50
"Bustin' My Ass" - 3:35
"Write You a Letter" - 2:28
"Ease Your Pain" (Hoyt Axton) - 3:04
"If You Ever" - 3:19
"Hello L.A., Bye Bye Birmingham" (Delaney Bramlett, Mac Davis) - 3:52 produced by Andy Johns and Bobby Whitlock

Side two - Velvet
"You Came Along" - 3:04
"Think About It" - 3:09
"Satisfied" - 3:00
"Dearest I Wonder" (Bobby Whitlock, Paula Boyd) - 3:50
"Start All Over" - 3:25

Personnel
Bobby Whitlock - rhythm guitar, keyboards, vocals
Eric Clapton - guitar (uncredited on "Hello L.A., Bye Bye Birmingham"), bass ("Hello L.A., Bye Bye Birmingham")
Keith Ellis - bass 
Rick Vito - lead guitar 
Don Poncher - drums
Jim Gordon - drums on "Hello L.A., Bye Bye Birmingham"
George Harrison - guitar 
Jim Price - trumpet 
Bobby Keys - saxophone
Technical
Anthony Fawcett - London coordinator
John Kosh - design concept
Ruby Mazur - design
Peter Howe - photography

References

1972 albums
Albums produced by Jimmy Miller